The University Boat Race Stones are two tapered, granite cuboids on southern embankments of the Tideway in west London, one 129 metres west of Putney Bridge and the other at Mortlake, 112 metres east of Chiswick Bridge.

The stones define the starting and finishing points of the Championship Course. The course, which is 4 miles and 374 yards (6,779 m) from Putney to Mortlake as measured along the centre of the river, is used for rowing races including the Oxford and Cambridge Boat Race, Women's Boat Race, Lightweight Boat Races, Head of the River Race and other races.  The finishing, western stone, is mirrored by a pyramid-topped post (wooden obelisk) across the river, painted in large bands of Oxford and Cambridge blue.  The race finishes a few metres short of the rowing club commonly known as "Scullers" or TSS.

They are etched "UBR" for University Boat Race.

Their coordinates are:
 Putney: 
 Mortlake:

See also
The Championship Course

References

External links
 The Boat Race: The Championship Course

The Boat Race
Geography of the River Thames
Mortlake, London
Putney
Rowing on the River Thames
Sport on the River Thames